LaKeisha Lawson (born June 3, 1987) is an American sprinter. She competed in the 60 metres event at the 2014 IAAF World Indoor Championships.

International competitions

USA Track and field National Championships

College
Lawson earned all-Mountain West Conference honors in 2006, 2008 and 2009 seasons representing UNLV. Lawson earned silver medals in MWC 100 meters, 200 meters outdoor, 60 meters and 200 meters indoor in 2009.

References

External links

LaKeisha Lawson Athletics profile
LaKeisha Lawson profile on Instagram
LaKeisha Lawson profile for Diamond League
LaKeisha Lawson profile on Twitter

1987 births
Living people
American female sprinters
University of Nevada, Las Vegas alumni
People from Victorville, California
People from San Pedro, Los Angeles
Athletes (track and field) at the 2015 Pan American Games
Pan American Games gold medalists for the United States
Pan American Games medalists in athletics (track and field)
Track and field athletes from Los Angeles
Medalists at the 2015 Pan American Games
21st-century American women